Trolls World Tour: Original Motion Picture Soundtrack is the soundtrack album to the 2020 DreamWorks Animation film Trolls World Tour, released by RCA Records on March 13, 2020. The soundtrack is produced primarily by singer-songwriter Justin Timberlake. The singles "The Other Side" by SZA and Timberlake and "Don't Slack" by Anderson .Paak and Timberlake were released prior to the album.

Background
As well as reprising his voice role as Branch in the sequel, Justin Timberlake also served as executive producer for its soundtrack, as he did on the original film's soundtrack, released in 2016. He revealed a handwritten list of the tracks on the soundtrack on his social media on February 13, also tagging the major artists featured on it.

Following the plot of the film, in which the Trolls from the first film discover that Trolls around the world are divided by six different types of music (pop, funk, classical, techno, country, and rock), the soundtrack features songs in those genres.

Track listing

Score

Charts

Weekly charts

Year-end charts

References

2020 soundtrack albums
2020s film soundtrack albums
Albums produced by Justin Timberlake
RCA Records soundtracks
Soundtrack
Musical film soundtracks